CMT Most Wanted Volume 1 is a country music compilation album. Released on September 16, 2003 by Capitol Records, it includes fifteen country singles from 1999 to 2003. The album peaked at number 11 on the Billboard Top Country Albums chart.

Track listing

Chart performance

References

2003 compilation albums
Country music compilation albums
Capitol Records compilation albums